Cameraria tildeni is a moth of the family Gracillariidae. It is known from California, United States.

The length of the forewings is 3.8-4.2 mm.

The larvae feed on Chrysolepis chrysophylla. They mine the leaves of their host plant. The mine is oblong to ovoid and the epidermis is opaque, yellow green. Most mines cross the midrib and only mature mines have a single fold.

Etymology
The species is named in honor of Dr. J. W. Tilden of San Jose, California, who has been the only entomologist to collect this insect when it was described.

References

Cameraria (moth)

Moths of North America
Lepidoptera of the United States
Moths described in 1981
Leaf miners
Fauna of California
Taxa named by Paul A. Opler
Taxa named by Donald R. Davis (entomologist)